Muqur District is a district located within Badghis Province in the western part of Afghanistan. It is located between the districts of Ab Kamari to the east, Qala i Naw to the south, Qadis to the southeast and Bala Murghab to the northeast. To the north is the national border with Turkmenistan. The district is in a long river valley. The estimated population in 2019 was 26,375.

References 

Districts of Badghis Province